The canton of Montmoreau-Saint-Cybard is a former administrative division in the Charente department, France. It had 4,710 inhabitants (2012). It was disbanded following the French canton reorganisation which came into effect in March 2015. It consisted of 14 communes, which joined the canton of Tude-et-Lavalette in 2015.

The canton comprised the following communes:

Aignes-et-Puypéroux
Bors
Courgeac
Deviat
Juignac
Montmoreau-Saint-Cybard
Nonac
Palluaud
Poullignac
Saint-Amant
Saint-Eutrope
Saint-Laurent-de-Belzagot
Saint-Martial
Salles-Lavalette

See also
Cantons of the Charente department

References

Former cantons of Charente
2015 disestablishments in France
States and territories disestablished in 2015